Der Schlangemann is a freely available seven-minute short film in pseudo-German made by Andreas Hansson and Björn Renberg in Umeå, Sweden, 1998–2000.
The film is in the form of an advertisement for a toy called Schlangemann, a Ken doll with an interchangeable penis in three sizes: normal, large, and gigantic.
Der Schlangemann received the audience award for best short film at the 13th Annual Horror and Fantasy Film Festival in San Sebastián, Spain, November 2002.

External links

 Archive of the movie

2002 films
Swedish animated short films
Swedish animated films
Swedish short films
2000s Swedish films